Emerenciana Ortiz Santos (July 21, 1937 – August 8, 2017), professionally known as Zeny Zabala, was a Filipina actress. Born and raised in Marikina, she was known as the villain of Sampaguita Pictures for her frequent roles as a villainess in her films.

Early life
The fourth child among nine siblings, Zabala was born in Marikina on April 21, 1937 to shoemaker Enrique Santos and Ursula Ortiz.

Career
She was discovered when she was accompanying her sister Caridad who was then in the film industry in 1953. Her first role was as a mother in the 1953 film Siga-Siga who dies giving birth to the character of Anita Linda. As a result of her film career, she was forced to drop out from high school in her 2nd year. Her first movie for Sampaguita Pictures was Binibining Kalog opposite Lolita Rodriguez and Ramon Revilla, and she later married actor Rodolfo "Boy" Garcia on June 30, 1958.

In 1963, Zabala became a freelance actress. In 1964, Zabala earned her first FAMAS acting nomination as Best Supporting Actress for Ang Bukas Ay Akin!, topbilled by Charito Solis and Nestor de Villa. In the same year, she remarried with director Ben Feleo.

In the mid-1960s, Zabala began establishing businesses in Marikina outside her film career, such as a restaurant called Zeny Zabala's Canteen near the town's Shoe Trade Fair, a shoe-making shop called LeConstant Shoe Shop, and a furniture store. Zabala is soon offered by businessman Narciso G. Isidro, the grandfather of singer Agot Isidro, a lead role in the film Ruby, to be produced by his newly established film studio in Marikina called NGI Productions.

In the 1980s, she continued to appear in more Dolphy films such as Kalabog en Bosyo Strike Again (1985) and her last known big screen appearance, Tataynic (1998), both directed by her husband Ben, who died in 2011. She co-starred with Vilma Santos in Marilou Diaz-Abaya's Baby Tsina in 1984, and appeared as Santos' cruel mother-in-law in Chito Roño's Ikaw Lang in 1991.

She joined the cast of John en Marsha in 1982 as the mother of Madel, Rolly Puruntong's wife.

Death
Zabala died on August 8, 2017, aged 80 in Manila, Philippines.

Filmography

Film

References

External links
Biodata, newsflash.org; accessed 22 August 2017.
The mark of ZZ, asianjournal.com; accessed 22 August 2017.

1934 births
2017 deaths
20th-century Filipino businesspeople
Filipino film actresses
Filipino television actresses
Filipino women in business
People from Marikina